Nova Milanese is a comune (municipality) in the Province of Monza and Brianza in the Italian region Lombardy, located about  north of Milan.  It received the honorary title of city with a presidential decree. Nova Milanese borders the following municipalities: Cinisello Balsamo, Desio, Muggiò, Paderno Dugnano, Varedo.

History

At the beginning of the 20th century the main economic activity was the breeding of silkworms. This continued until the 1920s when there was the advent of synthetic fibers. In addition to the soil grains, it produced excellent grapes, in fact Nova Milanese appears along with 20 other countries as the best producer of wine in the ranking by the Milanese poet Carlo Porta in 1815.

References

External links
 Official website